Karelian refers to something from or related to the region of Karelia, in present-day Russia and Finland.
Karelians, the Balto-Finnic people of this area
Karelian language, their Finnic language
Karelian foods
 Karelian pasties
 Karelian hot pot
 Karelian Birch, a cultivar of Betula pendula
 Karelian Birch (Fabergé egg), a Fabergé egg made from Karelian birch wood
 Karelian Bear Dog
 Karelian Bobtail, a natural bobtail cat
 Karelian Air Command, a Finnish Air Force unit
 Karelian question in Finnish politics

See also
 Karelia (disambiguation)
 Kurilian (disambiguation)

Language and nationality disambiguation pages